Safeway Insurance Group is a privately held insurance company, providing primarily automobile insurance.

History 
Safeway Insurance was founded in 1959 by the Parrillo family.  The family is an historic private investor in the Chicago Sun-Times.

Description 
Safeway Insurance is currently headquartered in Westmont, Illinois in the United States.

Safeway Insurance Group is the largest, privately held, family owned insurance company in the United States. In addition to its headquarters, Safeway maintains field offices in some of the states it conducts business in.

Safeway currently conducts business in Alabama, Arizona, Arkansas, California, Colorado, Georgia, Illinois, Louisiana, Mississippi, New Mexico, Tennessee and Texas.

Subsidiaries:

 Safeway Insurance Company
 Safeway Direct Insurance Company
 Safeway Insurance Company of Alabama
 Safeway Insurance Company of Arkansas
 Safeway Insurance Company of Georgia
 Safeway Insurance Company of Louisiana
 Safeway Financial Holding Company

Governance 
Robert J. Parrillo, William's brother, is a key shareholder.

References

Insurance companies of the United States
Insurance companies based in Illinois
Companies based in DuPage County, Illinois
Westmont, Illinois
American companies established in 1959
Financial services companies established in 1959
Privately held companies based in Illinois